Allenia  may refer to:
 Allenia, a monotypic genus of bird in the family Mimidae
 Allenia, a synonym of the plant genus Micrantheum in the family Picrodendraceae
 Allenia, a synonym of the plant genus Radyera in the family Malvaceae